William Gohl (February 6, 1873 – March 3, 1927) was a German-American alleged serial killer who, while working as a union official, allegedly murdered sailors passing through Aberdeen, Washington. He allegedly murdered for an unknown period of time and was a suspect in dozens of murders until his capture in 1910. Spared from the death penalty by a request for leniency by the jury, he was sentenced to life in prison at Walla Walla State Penitentiary where he died in 1927 from lobar pneumonia and erysipelas complicated by dementia paralytic caused by syphilis. Recent scholarship has cast significant doubt on the veracity of the accusations against Gohl, with historian Aaron Goings arguing that the numerous bodies discovered in Grays Harbor were the result of accidental deaths caused by unsafe conditions on the docks and in the timber industry, and that Gohl was unjustly blamed for these deaths by influential local businessmen hoping to do away with a powerful figure in the local labor movement.

Occupation and alleged murders
Little is known about Gohl's early life though at one point as an adult, he went to the Yukon chasing gold. He was unsuccessful, and on his return to Aberdeen he took on work as a bartender. During this time it was alleged that he may have been responsible for numerous murders. The bodies of migrant workers were found after washing up on the shores, robbed of any valuables or money they were known to have. Gohl is alleged to have started a fire which burned a saloon in Alaska.  It is also alleged that a "Jacob Miller" and wife had "vanished" while living in a cabin owned by Gohl on Laidlaw Island (near Westport, Washington). In March 1912, a human skull was found buried near the cabin owned by Gohl; another skull had previously been found near the same spot on a beach and was thought to have been of "Red" Miller who had "disappeared" and was believed to have been a victim of Gohl. 
Gohl was employed as a union official at the Sailors' Union of the Pacific. Before this he had been employed as a bartender after returning broke from the Yukon.  Already an accomplished criminal, Gohl was accused of being responsible for many of the large numbers of deceased migrant workers that were found washed up on shore during his tenure as a bartender, as well as a number of other crimes.

In 1905, during the great waterfront strike Gohl was charged with "assembling men under arms" and is also alleged to have forcibly abducted non-union crewmen from the  schooner Fearless for which he was fined $1,250 in the Superior Court. As a union official, Gohl used his reputation and intimidating size to discourage strikes and "recruit" new union members.

The Union building was allegedly a location that was ideal for his crimes, both in providing victims, and in concealing the evidence of their murders. Sailors arriving in the port of Aberdeen would usually visit the Sailor's Union building soon after disembarking. There they could collect their mail and, if they wished, set some money aside in savings.

Gohl would usually be on duty, alone. Typically, Gohl would ask if the sailors had any family or friends in the area. Then he would turn the conversation to the topic of money and valuables. If the sailor was just passing through, and would not be missed by anyone in the area, and had more than a trivial amount of cash or valuables on hand, Gohl would choose him as his next victim.

Gohl was accused of killing his victims in the union building by shooting them, relieving them of their money and valuables, and disposing of them in the Wishkah River, which ran behind the building and into Grays Harbor. According to some reports, there was a chute which descended from a trapdoor in the building directly into the river. Other reports state that Gohl would use a small launch to murder his victims  and dump the bodies directly in the harbor. Though suspected of being responsible for the large number of sailors who would disembark in Aberdeen and disappear, nothing was done to stop him until an accomplice, John Klingenberg, was brought back to Aberdeen after trying to jump ship in Mexico to escape prosecution, or possibly to escape Gohl.

Arrest 
Klingenberg was able to testify to seeing Gohl alone with a sailor, Charles Hatberg/Hatteberg, whose body had recently been found in the harbor at Indian Creek February 2, 1910, soon after his disappearance  on December 21, 1909.  Hatberg had been shot with a .38 Automatic pistol which had been found in the salt flats by his body. The ownership was traced to Gohl. The motive according to Klingenburg's confession was that Gohl claimed Hatberg had told a "detective Miller" that Gohl had shot a cow the previous summer.

Gohl had already been arrested in February 1910 for the Hatberg murder and was convicted of two counts of murder, though suspected of 41 or more, found guilty May 12, 1910 and sentenced to life imprisonment and taken to the State Prison June 13, 1910. Besides Hatberg, the second count was for the murder of John Hoffman, a witness to the Hatberg murder who was shot and injured by Gohl on the night of the murder, and killed the next day by Klingenberg, for which Hoffman's killer was sentenced to 20 years.

Hoffman had been killed December 23, 1909, after the Hatberg killing, and had been robbed of $400.00 and also disposed of in the Harbor near Indian Creek. In July 1910, a human skeleton was found in Indian Creek; however, it is not known whether these were the remains of Hoffman. Other corpses found in the Grays Harbor area were suggested to be victims of Gohl, including the body of Carl O. Carlson, found on April 27, 1910, floating in the harbor. Gohl was later transferred to an asylum for the criminally insane, where he died in 1927. He is buried in an open field above West Medical Lake, Eastern State Hospital

See also 
 List of serial killers in the United States

References

Further reading

1927 deaths
1905 murders in the United States
1873 births
20th-century American criminals
American male criminals
American people convicted of murder
American people who died in prison custody
American prisoners sentenced to life imprisonment
Deaths from pneumonia in Washington (state)
Deaths from syphilis
Emigrants from the German Empire to the United States
People convicted of murder by Washington (state)
People from Aberdeen, Washington
Prisoners sentenced to life imprisonment by Washington (state)
Prisoners who died in Washington (state) detention
Sailors' Union of the Pacific people
Suspected serial killers
Trade unionists from Washington (state)